is a Japanese free announcer who is represented with Ten Carat. She is a former announcer for Nippon TV.

Filmography

Current

Former

When enrolling in Aoyama Gakuin University

When joining Nippon TV

After leaving Nippon TV and before joining Ten Carat

After joining Ten Carat

References

External links
 

Japanese announcers
Aoyama Gakuin University alumni
People from Saitama Prefecture
1981 births
Living people